The 2009 NatWest Pro40 was a league system 40 over competition. Sussex Sharks won Division One, while Warwickshire Bears finished top of Division Two.

This was the last year the competition was held. It was succeeded by the Clydesdale Bank 40, which combined a league format with knockout stages.

Division One

Division two

References

NatWest Pro40
NatWest Group